The year 1915 in archaeology involved some significant events.

Explorations 
 Hiram Bingham III finishes his explorations of Machu Picchu, begun in 1911.

Excavations
 R. E. Merwin leads Harvard University's Peabody Museum of Archaeology and Ethnology project at Lubaantun.
 Alfred V. Kidder (director of the Southwestern Expedition for Phillips Andover Academy) excavates Pecos Pueblo, New Mexico (ending 1927).
 Earl Halstead Morris excavates Twin Angels Pueblo.
 Nijmegen Helmet is found in the Netherlands.

Publications
 Sylvanus Morley - An Introduction to the Study of Maya Hieroglyphs.

Events
 21 September - Cecil Chubb acquires Stonehenge at auction for £6600.
 The first of the 'Etruscan terracotta warriors', forged by sculptor Alfredo Fioravanti with the Riccardi family, is purchased by the Metropolitan Museum of Art in New York City.

Births
August 8 - María Rostworowski, Peruvian historian (died 2016).
December 8 - Bernard Fagg, English archaeologist working in Nigeria (died 1987).
December 28 - Martyn Jope, British archaeologist and biochemist (died 1996).
Michael J. O'Kelly, Irish archaeologist (died 1982).

Deaths 
 February 23 - Theodore M. Davis, American Egyptological excavation sponsor (born 1837).
 May 10 - Gaston Cros, French army officer and archaeologist, killed in action (born 1861).
 October 24 - Désiré Charnay, French archaeologist of Central America (born 1828).
 Sir Alfred Biliotti, Italian Levantine British consular officer and archaeologist (born 1833)

References

Archaeology
Archaeology
Archaeology by year